Nkemjika Natalie Ezurike (born March 19, 1992) is a Canadian soccer player. She plays as a forward for the Canada women's national soccer team and Israeli club ASA Tel Aviv.

Early life
Ezurike was born in Halifax, Nova scotia, and attended Sackville High School in Lower Sackville.

University of Michigan
Ezurike attended the University of Michigan where she played for the Wolverines from 2010 to 2013.

Club career
In 2012 and 2013, she played with the Laval Comets in the USL W-League.

Ezurike was selected eighth overall by the Boston Breakers in the 2014 NWSL College Draft and later signed with the team.

On January 14, 2016 she signed with Vittsjö GIK in the Damallsvenskan.

Ezurike signed with Mallbackens IF for the 2017 season.

International career
Ezurike made her debut for the Canada women's national soccer team in 2014. She was named to Canada's squad for the 2015 Pan American Games in Toronto.

Honours 
Canada U-20
Runner-up
 CONCACAF Women's U-20 Championship: 2012

References

External links 
 
 Boston Breakers player profile
 Michigan player profile
 

1992 births
Living people
Sportspeople from Halifax, Nova Scotia
Soccer people from Nova Scotia
Canadian women's soccer players
Women's association football forwards
Canada women's international soccer players
Canadian expatriate women's soccer players
Expatriate women's soccer players in the United States
Expatriate women's footballers in Sweden
Canadian expatriate sportspeople in the United States
Michigan Wolverines women's soccer players
Boston Breakers draft picks
Boston Breakers players
Vittsjö GIK players
Mallbackens IF players
National Women's Soccer League players
Damallsvenskan players
Canadian sportspeople of Nigerian descent
Black Canadian women's soccer players
Laval Comets players
USL W-League (1995–2015) players
Canadian expatriate sportspeople in Sweden